The Bogatyr battalion was a battalion made up of deserters from the Russian army formed in 19th-century Iran, primarily during and for a time after the era of the Russo-Iranian Wars.

See also
 Samson Makintsev
 Yevstafii Skryplev

Sources
 
 Батальон богатырей // Б (Blanc) порох — Бомба. — СПб. ; [М.] : Тип. т-ва Ivan Sytin, 1911. — С. 412. — (Военная энциклопедия : [в 18 т.] / Под ред. В. Ф. Новицкого [и др.] ; т. 4).
 
 Kibovskii, Aleksandr. BAGADERAN" - RUSSIAN DESERTERS IN THE PERSIAN ARMY, 1802-1839. (From Tseikhgauz, No. 5, 1996.)

Russo-Persian Wars
Iran–Russia relations
Military history of Qajar Iran
19th-century military history of the Russian Empire